Senator Shapiro may refer to:

David C. Shapiro (1925–1981), Illinois State Senate
Florence Shapiro (born 1948), Texas State Senate